This is a list of sounding rockets used for suborbital research flights.

Argentina
Gamma Centauro
Gradicom-1
Proson-M1
Rigel series
Canopus-1, Canopus 2,
Castor (A)
Centenario
Orión series
Orión-1, Orión-2

Australia
Aeolus
Aero High
AUSROC series
AUSROC I, AUSROC II, AUSROC II-2, AUSROC 2.5, AUSROC III
Cockatoo series
Cockatoo Mk 1, Cockatoo Mk 2, Cockatoo Mk 3, Cockatoo Mk 4
Corella
HEAC
HAD
HARP
HAT
Long Tom
Lorikeet series
Lorikeet Mk-1, Lorikeet Mk-2
Kookabura series
Kookaburra Mk.1, Kookaburra Mk.2, Kookaburra Mk.3
Sighter
Zuni

Brazil
MB
Sonda family 
Sonda 1,  Sonda 2, Sonda 3, Sonda 3 M1, Sonda 4
VS-30, VS-30/Orion, VS-40, VSB-30
S-40 series
VS-40M
VSV-30 (Brazilian Exploration Vehicle)

Canada
Black Brant
Black Brant 1 (Black Brant I)
Black Brant 2,  (Black Brant II) Black Brant 2B (Black Brant IIB)
Black Brant 3,  (Black Brant III) Black Brant 3B (Black Brant IIIB)
Black Brant 4 Black Brant 4A (Black Brant IVA), Black Brant 4B (Black Brant IVB)
Black Brant 5, Black Brant 5A (Black Brant VA), Black Brant 5B (Black Brant VB), Black Brant 5C (Black Brant VC)
Black Brant 6 (Black Brant VI)
Black Brant 7 (Black Brant VAII)
Black Brant 8 (Nike-Black Brant), Black Brant 8B, Black Brant 8C
Black Brant 9, (Black Brant IX) Black Brant 9B, (Black Brant IXB) Black Brant 9BM1,  Black Brant 9CM1 (Black Brant 9 Mod-1, Starfire-1)
Black Brant 10, (Black Brant X) Black Brant 10B, (Black Brant XB) Black Brant 10CM1 (Black Brant Mod-1)
Black Brant 11 (Black Brant XI), Black Brant 11-A 
Black Brant 12 (Black Brant XII), Black Brant 12-A
Excalibur, Excalibur 2
HARP 5-1, HARP 5-3, 
HARP 7-1, HARP 7-2
Martlet, Martlet 1
Martlet 2, Martlet 2A, Martlet 2B, Martlet 2C,  Martlet 2G
Martlet 3, Martlet 3A, Martlet 3B, Martlet 3D, Martlet 3E
Martlet 4, Martlet 4A, Martlet 4B, Martlet 4C
Scorpius SR-XM-1 (Wild Fire))

China
761
DF-21
THP2
THP6
T-7, T-7A, T-7A-S2, T-7A-S, T-7/GF-01A, T-7M
 Tianying-3C
Zhinui

Democratic Republic of the Congo
 Troposphere series
 Troposphere 1, Troposphere 2, Troposphere 3, Troposphere 4, Troposphere 5, Troposphere 6

Egypt
 Al Kahir

France
 Antares
 Aurore
 Belenos
 Belia
 Bélier (rocket) family 
 Bélier I (Jericho), Belier II (Export), Bélier III (Vega),
 Belisama,
 Bérénice series 
 Bérénice-1,  Berenice-2,  Berenice-3
 Centaure, (Venus) Centaure 1, Centaure 2A, Centaure 2B, Centaure 2C
 Daniel l
 Dauphin
 Dragon (Stromboli), Dragon-2B,  Dragon-3,
 Emma
 Epona
 Éridan
 Lex
 Meteo Meteo-MD
 Monica, Monica I, Monica IV
 Pegase
 Rubis
 Stromboli
 Tacite
 Titus
 Véronique (rocket)
 Véronique 61, Véronique 61M, Véronique AGI, Véronique N, Véronique NA
 Vesta

Germany
 Mohr Rocket
 Forschungsflugkorper
 Cirrus, Cirrus I, Cirrus II,
 Poggensee
 Kumulus
 Seliger Rocket family, Seliger 1, Seliger 2, Seliger 3,
 V-2

The Netherlands
 T-Minus Dart
 CanSat
 Stratos series
 Stratos I, Stratos II, Stratos II+, Stratos III

India
 Rohini series
 Menaka II
 RH-75
 RH-125
 RH-200
 RH-200SV
 RH-300
 RH-300/RH-200/RH-200
 RH-300 Mk II
 RH-560
 RH-560 Mk II
 RH-560/300 Mk II
 Advanced Technology Vehicle
 Vyom

Indonesia
 LAPAN
 RX-250
 RX-250-LPN

International
 CanSat

Iran
 Kavoshgar series
 Kavoshgar 1 (Type A)
 Kavoshgar 2, 3 (Type B)
 Kavoshgar 4, 5, 6, Pishgam (Type C),
 Kavoshgar Pazhuhesh (Type D)

Italy
 Rocksanne series
 Rocksanne I-X, Rocksanne I-X CT
 Rocksanne II-X
 Rocksanne E-X
 HRE100K (Hybrid Rocket Engine 100K)
 Sispre series
 Sispre C-41
 Sispre BDP Meteorological
 Sispre multi-stage geophysical

Japan
 BT-310
 HM-16
 HIMES Rockoon
 JCR
 Kappa family, Kappa 1, Kappa 2, Kappa3, Kappa 4,  Kappa 5, Kappa 6, Kappa 6H, Kappa 7,  Kappa 8, Kappa 8L, Kappa 9, Kappa 9L, Kappa 9M, Kappa 10, Kappa 10C, Kappa 10S
Lamba 2
Lamba 3, Lamba 3H
 MT-135, MT-135JA MT-135P
 NAL-7
 NAL-16
 NAL-25
 S-A
 S-B
 S-C
 SA-II
 SB-735
 ST
 S-160
 S-210
 S-250
 S-300 ISAS
 S-310
 S-520, S-520-30
 SS-520
 TR-1A
 TT-200
 TT-210
 TT-500, TT-500A

Malaysia
 Low Satellite Level Project

New Zealand
 Atea-1
 Atea-2

North Korea
 Hwasong 6

Norway
 Pantera

Pakistan
Pakistan's sounding rocket program used a variety of sounding rockets which were renamed in 3 series. Some flights were not given a Pakistani designation. Sounding rockets were flown from the Sonmiani Rocket Range.
 Centaure (a.k.a. Rehbar, Rehnuma, Shahpar)
 Dragon (a.k.a. Shahpar)
 Judi-Dart (a.k.a. Rehbar, Rehnuma)
 Nike-Apache (a.k.a. Rehbar)
 Nike-Cajun (a.k.a. Rehbar)
 Petrel (a.k.a. Rehbar)
 Skua (a.k.a. Rehbar)

Poland
 Meteor,  family, Meteor-1, Meteor-2H, Meteor-2K, Meteor-3
ILR-33 AMBER

Russia
 M-100,     M-100 (A1)   M-100A  M-100B
 MERA
 MMR06
 MR-1 Meteo
 MR-12
 MR-20
 MR-25
 MR-30
 MT-135
 W-1B (R-1B), W-1D (R-1D), (W-1E (R-1E), W-1W (R-1W) Geophysical Rockets
 R-2A
 R-5A, R-5V (Vertikal)
 R-11A
 V-3V
 Vertical-4
 W-2A (R-2)

Spain
 INTA-100
 INTA-255
 INTA-300, INTA-300B
 PLD Space Miura 1

South Korea
 Blackbird
 HANBIT-TLV
KARI KSR-I
 KARI KSR-II
 KARI KSR-III

Switzerland
 Micon Zenit

Taiwan
 Sounding Rocket

United Kingdom
 Skua family
Skua 1, Skua 2, Skua 3, Skua 4
 Petrel family
Petrel 1, Petrel 2
 Skylark family
Skylark 1,  Skylark 2, Skylark 2 AC,  Skylark 2C, Skylark 3, Skylark 3 AC,  Skylark 4, Skylark 4 AC, Skylark 5, Skylark 5C,  Skylark 6, Skylark 6 AC,  Skylark 7, Skylark 7 AC,  Skylark 7C,  Skylark 8,  Skylark 9, Skylark 10 (Skylark 10A), Skylark 11,  Skylark 12, Skylark 12 AC, Skylark 14, Skylark 15, Skylark 16, Skylark 17,
 Fulmar

United States
 Aerobee family,
 Aerobee RTV-N-8 (N-8a1, RTV-8 and Aerojet XASR-SC-1, all with the XASR-SC-1 engine )
 X-8 (RTV-A-1, RTV-N-10, and Aerojet XAR-SC-2, all with the Aerojet XASR-SC-1 engine)
 Aerobee X-8A, (RTV-A-1a, RTV-N-10a, with Aerojet AJ10-25 engine),
 Aerobee X-8B, (RTV-A-1b with Aerojet XAR-SC-1 engine - a test vehicle)
 Aerobee X-8C (RTV-A-1c, with the Aerojet AJ10-25 engine)
 Aerobee X-8D (RTV-A-1d, Aerojet AJ10-25 - apparently never launched)
 Aerobee RTV-N-10b, with the Aerojet AJ10-24 engine
 Aerobee RTV-N-10c, with the Aerojet AJ10-34 engine
 Aerobee AJ10-25 with the AJ10-25 engine,
 Aerobee AJ10-27 with the AJ10-27 engine,
 Aerobee AJ10-34, with the AJ10-34 engine,
 Aerobee 75 (Aerobee Hawk)
 Aerobee 100 (Aerobee Junior)
 Aerobee 150 (Aerobee-Hi, PWN-2), Aerobee 150 MI, Aerobee 150 MII Aerobee 150 MII 20 Aerobee 150A, Aerobee 150A MII
 Aerobee 170 (Nike-Aerobee,), Areobee 170A
 Aerobee 200, Aerobee 200A, 
 Aerobee 300 (Sparrowbee also Spaerobee), Aerobee 300A
 Aerobee 350
 Apache
 Ascamp
 Aspan 300
 Arcas, Arcas-Robin, Rooster, Super Arcas
 Archer (PWN-4)
 Argo A-1 (Percheron)
 Argus
 Aries
 Ascamp
 Asp I,
 Asp Apache
 Astrobee family, Astrobee D, Astrobee F, Astrobee 200, Astrobee 500, Astrobee 1500
 Athena RTV
 ATK LV
 Bullpup Apache
 Bullpup Cajun
 Blue Scout Junior
 Boosted Arcas, Boosted Arcas II,
 Boosted Dart
 Bumper
 Cajun
 Cajun Dart
 Caleb (Project Hi-Ho)
 Castor
 Castor Lance
 CleanSweep III, Cleansweep IIIA
 Dac Roc
 Deacon Arrow II
 Deacon Judi
 Doorknob 1
 Doorknob 2
Exos (PWN-4)
 GoFast
 Hasp I, HASP II, HASP III
HJ (Honest John) Hydac,>
HJ Nike Hydac,
HJ Nike Javelin,
HJ Nike, 
HJ Nike Nike (Boa),
HJ Orion
Honest John-Tommahawk
 Hopi Dart
 HPB
 Hydra-Iris
 Hydra Sandhawk
 Improved Malemute
 Improved Orion
 Iris
 Javelin (Argo D-4), Javelin III
 Jaguar
Journeyman (Argo D-8)
 Judy-Dart
 Kitty (PWN-6, Sidewinder-HV Arcas)
 Kiva/Hopi (Phoenix)
 LCLV
 Loki (PWN-1)
 Loki II (Hawk)
 Loki Dart (Loki-Wasp, XRM-82, PWN-1A, also PWN-8 PWN-8B, PWN-10, PWN-11, PWN-12 Loki Datasonde)
 Loki-Wasp
 Malemute
 Mesquito
 Microstar
 Nike, Nike Apache, Nike Hydac, Nike Iroquois (Niro), Nike Javelin, Nike Javelin 3, Nike Nike (Python), Nike Orion, Nike Orion Improved,  Nike Tomahawk, Nike Viper 1, Nike Yardbird, Nike Cajun (PWN-3 a.k.a. CAN), Nike-Deacon (DAN), Nike Hawk, Nike Genie, Nike Smoke
 Oriole family, Oreole,  Oriole I (Loki-Dart), Oreole II (Terrier-Oriole), Oriole III (Talos Terrier Mk 70 Oreole), Oriole IIIA (Terrier Oriole Nihka), Oriole IV (Talos Terrier Mk 70 Oreole Nihka),
 Orion, Improved Orion
 Owl
 Ozarca
 Paiute Apache
 Paiute Tomahawk
 Pegasus
 Peregrine
 Phoenix
 Prospector
Purr-Kee
 PWN-5 Rocksonde 200
 PWN-8 Loki Datasonde, PWN-B, PWN-C, PWN-D
 PWN-10 Super Loki Datasonde, PWN-10A
 PWN-11 Super Loki Datasond, PWN-11A, PWN-11D (Datasonde)
 PWN-11 Super Loki Datasonde
 PWN-12 Super Loki ROBIN
 Raven
 Rockoon family, Deacon-Rockoon, Farside, HIMES Rockoon,  Loki Rockoon, Hawk Rockoon
Roksonde family
 Rooster (PWN-7)
 Seagull
 Sandhawk
 Sandhawk Tomahawk (Dualhawk)
Sarge (under development)
 Sergeant Sounding Rocket
Sergeant-Delta
 Sergeant Hydac
 Scout X-2
 Scanner
 Sirocco
 Sidewinder Arcas,
 Space Data LCLV
 SpaceLoft XL,
 Sparoair I
 Sparrow Arcas,
 Strongarm
 Strypi, Strypi IIAR, Strypi IIR, Strypi IV, Strypi VIIAR,
 Strypi-Tommahawk
 Super Arcas
 Super Chief, Super Chief II, Super Chief III
 Super Loki
 Super Loki Dart, PWN-10A, PWN-10B (Super Loki Datasonde), PWN-11 (Super Loki Datasonde),  PWN-12, (Super Loki Robin)
 Talos Castor
 Talos Sergeant Hydac
 Talos Terrier Black Brant
 Talos Terrier Black Brant-Nihka
 Talos Terrier Oriole  (Oriole 3)
 Talos Terrier Oriole Nihka  (Oriole 4)
 Talos Terrier Perrgrine
 Taurus Orion
 Taurus Tomahawk
 Taurus Tomahawk Nike (Taurus-Nike-Tommahawk)
 Terasca
 Terarapin
 Terrier
 Terrier /551
 Terrier Asp (Tarp)
 Terrier ASROC Cajun (TERESCA)
 Terrier Black Brant
 Terrier Improved Orion
 Terrier Malemute, Terrier Improved Malemute (Terrier Mk.70 Patriot)
 Terrier Improved Nihka
 Terrier Oriole Nihka
 Terrier Orion, Terrier Improved Orion
 Terrier Perrgrine
 Terrier Sandhawk
 Terrier Sounding Rocket
 Terrier Tomahawk
 Tiamat
Tic
Tomahawk
 Tomahawk Sandia
 Ute
 Ute Apache
 Ute Tomahawk
 V-2
 Viking, Viking Type 9
 Viper Dart, Viper IIA, Viper 3A/10D Dart, Viper V/Dart
 Viper Falcon
 Wac Corporal
 Wasp
 X-15A

See also
 List of orbital launch systems

References

Sounding rockets